Micheletti is an Italian surname, derived from the given name Michele. Notable people with the surname include:

Andrea Micheletti (born 1991), Italian rower
Estadio Humberto Micheletti
Joe Micheletti, hockey analyst
Luisa Micheletti, Brazilian presenter
Pat Micheletti, American hockey player
Pietro Micheletti
Roberto Micheletti, de facto President of Honduras for seven months in 2009–2010, following the 2009 Honduran coup d'etat

Italian-language surnames
Patronymic surnames
Surnames from given names